The Minnesota Golden Gophers men's ice hockey team is the college ice hockey team at the Twin Cities campus of the University of Minnesota. They are members of the Big Ten Conference and compete in National Collegiate Athletic Association (NCAA) Division I ice hockey.  The Golden Gophers have won five NCAA national championships, in 1974, 1976, 1979, 2002 and 2003. The team also shared the 1929 National Intercollegiate Athletic Association championship with Yale. and captured the national Amateur Athletic Union (AAU) championship for amateur hockey in 1940. The Gophers are currently coached by Bob Motzko. Under Don Lucia the Gophers earned a spot in the NCAA tournament in eight seasons during a nine-year time span, including five number 1 seeds and three appearances in the Frozen Four. The team's main rivalries are with the University of Wisconsin and the University of North Dakota, although several other schools claim Minnesota as their archrival.
For much of the team's history, there has been a strong emphasis on recruiting native Minnesotan high school and junior hockey players, as opposed to out-of-state, Canadian, or European players. This helped high school ice hockey grow in Minnesota, particularly starting with Hall of Famer John Mariucci, who refused to recruit players from Canada. Minnesota high school ice hockey programs grew from 26 in 1945 to over 150 in 1980. Head coach Doug Woog championed home-grown talent even more, only recruiting Minnesota players in the late 1980s and 1990s, but recent rosters have been more diversified.

History

Early history 1895–1952
According to records, the first intercollegiate hockey team at the University of Minnesota was organized in 1895 by Dr. H. A. Parkyn, a Toronto native who also played on the school's football team. An early Minnesota team played the Winnipeg Seven at the now demolished Athletic Park in downtown Minneapolis. They lost 11–3.

In 1900 George Northrup, Paul Joslyn, and A.R. Gibbons headed a committee to create an official varsity hockey club at the U. Although there was some effort to get Northrop Field flooded, it was ultimately decided to play on Como Lake in St. Paul. Although the 1903 season saw the first scheduled organized competitions for Minnesota hockey, ultimately this season would be the last organized hockey season for almost two decades. In 1910 efforts were made to revive competition and outreach to the University of Chicago and University of Wisconsin, other members of the Big Ten Conference, but these plans never materialized.

In January 1914 the Minnesota Board of Regents voted to fund a hockey team. However the University Athletic Board did not officially recognize this team as a varsity team. At this time, a number of fraternity squads existed and other intramural ice hockey competitions were taking place. Professor OS Zelner worked to organize some of this competition. There was also some interest in women's hockey competition.

In 1920–1921, a hockey team again skated representing the University of Minnesota. W. Beaupre Eldredge of St. Paul, a student and club player at the time, was very instrumental in organizing the team, promoting the team to the University Board of Regents to become an official varsity sport. For 1921–1922 season the University Athletic Board of Control decided to finally give ice hockey varsity status on January 9, 1922, answering a petition organized by Merle "Frenchy" DeForest, the president of a new booster organization for the sport, which itself grew out of enthusiasm for hockey among the interfraternal league. During this season, the team finished with a 7–3 record, led by head coach I.D. MacDonald and captain Chester “Chet” Bros. Other members of the 1921–22 team include center Paul Swanson and wingman Frank R. Pond, who were named captains for the following seasons, Swanson in 1922–23 and Pond in 1923–24. DeForest, Swanson and Pond were all members of Phi Sigma Kappa fraternity, while Bros was a member of Delta Tau Delta.

For the 1923–1924 season Danish Canadian Emil Iverson assumed the role as head coach. During Iverson's first season as coach the team attained a record of 13–1–0. The team played their games at Minneapolis Arena starting in 1924–1925 season. Such players as Chuck McCabe, Joel Brown, John H. Peterson were accorded All-American honors during this era. Iverson's coaching tenure culminated in Minnesota sharing the National Intercollegiate Athletic Association hockey championship with Yale. Following the 1929–1930 season Emil Iverson accepted a position as coach of the Chicago Blackhawks

Frank Pond, former team captain, became coach in 1930 after the departure of Emil Iverson. The team's Rookie of the Year award is named in his honor.

Doc Romnes era (1947–52)
During Romnes's second year, the NCAA sponsored the first Division I Men's hockey tournament. Minnesota did not qualify for the four team playoff during his coaching tenure.

John Mariucci era (1952–66)
In the 1952 season, John Mariucci led the Gophers to the National Championship game, with a 23–6 record, after going 13–13 the year before.

Mariucci was a driving force behind the philosophy of stacking the team with Minnesota talent. Even while other programs brought in older and bigger Canadian prospects, Mariucci thoroughly believed in growing the game in Minnesota, from the ground up. He held coaching clinics, and opened ice rinks in numerous Minnesota towns. This, combined with a sense of pride that the Gophers' roster was stacked with Minnesota talent, was monumental for Minnesota taking a real step forward in producing hockey talent.

George Nagobads was hired as the team's physician in 1958, and remained with the team until 1992.

Glen Sonmor era (1966–71)
After coaching one season at Ohio State, Glen Sonmor became the head coach of the Gophers in 1966. Sonmor's Gophers started off slowly, finishing 8th, 5th, and 5th in the WCHA during Sonmor's first 3 seasons behind the bench. Things turned around for the Gophers in the 1969–70 season, as Sonmor led the team to its first WCHA Championship in 16 seasons, finishing with a 21–12–0 record. In the process, Sonmor was named the WCHA Coach of the Year.

The following season, the Gophers ended a 10-year NCAA Tournament drought, along with capturing a WCHA Tournament Championship. Sonmor led the Gophers to the NCAA Championship game, beating Harvard 6–5 in the first round. The Gophers lost to Boston University in the Championship game, by a score of 4–2.

During Sonmor's rather short tenure as Minnesota's head coach, the team saw attendance rise 60 percent. Sonmor finished his career with a 78–80–6 record, and coached 3 All Americans: Gary Gambucci (1968), Murray McLachlan (1970), and Wally Olds (1970). Sonmor left the Gophers after the 1971 season, to coach the Minnesota Fighting Saints of the World Hockey Association. Sonmor returned later to be the radio analyst for the Gophers on WCCO-AM.

Brad Buetow era (1979–85)
Brad Buetow was head coach from 1979 to 1985.  At the start of the 1984–85 season, he hired Thomas "Chico" Adrahtas as an assistant coach.  The team won 31 games, came in second in the WCHA, and made the NCAA tournament.  Adrahtas has been accused by a number of former players of coercing them into oral sex. The United States Center for SafeSport investigated, and issued its decision declaring that Adrahtas was permanently ineligible "from participating, in any capacity, in any event, program, activity, or competition authorized by, organized by, or under the auspices of the United States Olympic & Paralympic Committee (USOPC), the National Governing Bodies recognized by the USOPC, a Local Affiliated Organization as defined by the Code, or any High Performance Management Organization (HPMO), or at a facility under the jurisdiction of the same."

Championships

National Championships

Runners-up in 1953, 1954, 1971, 1975, 1981, 1989, and 2014

Trophies
Big Ten Regular Season Championship Trophy:
 2013–14, 2014–15, 2015–16, 2016–17, 2021–22, 2022–23

Big Ten Tournament Championship Trophy:
 2015, 2021

MacNaughton Cup 13 times as WCHA regular season champions:
 1952–53, 1953–54, 1969–70, 1974–75, 1980–81, 1987–88, 1988–89, 1991–92, 1996–97, 2005–06, 2006–07, 2011–12, 2012–13

Broadmoor Trophy once as WCHA regular season champions (1983) and six times as the WCHA Tournament champions:
 1983, 1993, 1994, 1996, 2003, 2004, 2007

North Star College Cup, the annual intrastate tournament vs. Minnesota-Duluth, Minnesota State, St. Cloud State, and Bemidji State:
 2014

Mariucci Classic Champions 14 times:
 1991, 1995, 1996, 1999, 2000, 2001, 2002, 2003, 2004, 2005, 2006, 2009, 2012, 2016

Ice Breaker Invitational Champions three times:
 2007, 2013, 2014

Mariucci-Bessone Coaches Trophy for series vs. Michigan State, started in 1993 (Minnesota leads series 13–5–5):
 1993, 1994, 1995, 1996, 1998, 2003, 2004, 2006, 2009, 2012, 2013–14, 2014–15, 2015–16

Mariucci-Renfrew Coaches Trophy for series vs. Michigan, started in 1993 (Minnesota leads series: 10–9–2):
 1994, 1995, 1999, 2001, 2003, 2004, 2005, 2006, 2010, 2013-14

From 1959 to 1981, an annual Big Ten champion was crowned for the best record in regular season games among active Big Ten members, 10 times:
 1959–60, 1962–63, 1964–65, 1965–66, 1969–70, 1973–74, 1974–75, 1978–79, 1979–80, 1980–81

Season-by-season results

Source:

Records by opponent
Big Ten Conference opponents

Former WCHA opponents

Major non-conference opponents

Source:

Rivalries

The Gophers have historic rivalries with some of the top men's ice hockey programs in the NCAA, including both in-state as well as out of state rivalries.

Out of state rivalries include the University of Wisconsin Badgers and the University of North Dakota Fighting Hawks. The Gophers' rivalry against the Badgers is part of the annual "Border Battle," in which both universities keep a tallied score of all athletic competitions against one another.

The Gophers were engaged in one of the most notorious rivalries in college hockey history with the Boston University Terriers for over 30 years from 1963 to 1995. The rivalry came to its peak during the 1976 NCAA Championship Semi-Final when a bench-clearing brawl occurred only 70 seconds into the game, delaying it for nearly 30 minutes. The Gophers would go on to win the game 4–2 and subsequently, the Championship. A number of players on both teams would end up playing together for the gold medal-winning Miracle on Ice Team USA during the 1980 Winter Olympics, coached by Minnesota Head Coach Herb Brooks. The rivalry began its decline in 1984, when the Gophers would become members of the Western Collegiate Hockey Association and the Terriers the Hockey East Division, resulting in a steep decline in games against one another.

Due to the fact the State of Minnesota has six NCAA Division I hockey programs, the Gophers naturally share a rivalry with four of them: University of Minnesota-Duluth Bulldogs, St. Cloud State University Huskies, Minnesota State University, Mankato Mavericks and Bemidji State University Beavers. Four of the six programs (excluding Bemidji State and St. Thomas) participated in the inaugural North Star College Cup tournament during the 2013–2014 Ice Hockey Season.

Players

Current roster
As of August 19, 2022.

Olympians
This is a list of Minnesota alumni were a part of an Olympic team.

† Were members of the AHA team that was allowed to play in the Olympics but disqualified from medal contention.

Honored members

Retired Numbers
The Gophers have retired only one number. On November 15, 1998, the team retired John Mayasich's number 8.  Mayasich, a two-time All-American, played four seasons with the Gophers (1951–1955) and holds team records for goals and points scored both in a game and for a career.  Although he was a member of the silver medal 1956 and gold medal 1960 Winter Olympic U.S. hockey teams, he only played professionally briefly, in minor league hockey.

Hobey Baker Award
Four players from the University of Minnesota have won the Hobey Baker Award, awarded annually to "the outstanding collegiate hockey player in the United States."  Neal Broten (1978–1981) became the award's first recipient in 1981.  Robb Stauber (1986–1989) won the award as a sophomore in 1988, becoming the first goaltender to be so honored.  Brian Bonin (1992–1996) won the award in 1996 after nearly winning it the previous season.  In 2002, Jordan Leopold (1998–2002) became the first University of Minnesota player to win both the Hobey Baker Award and an NCAA Championship in the same season.

Golden Gophers players drafted in the first round of the NHL entry draft
Erik Johnson, Phil Kessel, Thomas Vanek, Blake Wheeler, Kyle Okposo, Erik Rasmussen, Douglas Zmolek, Keith Ballard, Michael Ramsey, Tom Chorske, Nick Leddy, Nick Bjugstad, David Fischer, Jordan Schroeder, Kris Chucko, Patrick White, Brady Skjei, James O'Brien, Jeff Taffe, Ryan Johnson, Chaz Lucius, Logan Cooley, Jimmy Snuggerud.

Statistical Leaders
Source:

Career points leaders

Career goaltending leaders

GP = Games played; Min = Minutes played; W = Wins; L = Losses; T = Ties; GA = Goals against; SO = Shutouts; SV% = Save percentage; GAA = Goals against average

Minimum 40 games

Statistics current through the start of the 2020–21 season.

Coaches
In their eighty-five season history, the Gophers have had a total of fourteen head coaches, including three interim coaches. John Mariucci took a one-year leave of absence during the 1955–1956 season to serve as head coach of the U.S. men's hockey team that won the silver medal at the 1956 Winter Olympics. Halfway through the 1971–1972 season, Glen Sonmor left the Gophers to become the general manager and head coach for the Minnesota Fighting Saints of the World Hockey Association. Doug Woog was suspended for two games during the 1996–1997 season for concealing an illegal payment to a former player after his scholarship ended. During this time, assistant head coach Mike Guentzel served as the team's head coach.
In 2009, Assistant Coach John Hill coached 2 games while Don Lucia was out for medical reasons.

All-time coaching records
As of the end of the 2021–22 season

* former Gophers player

Source:

Arenas

Minnesota State Fairgrounds Hippodrome (1923–1934)
Minneapolis Arena (1925–1950) (primary arena)
St. Paul Auditorium (1932–1950) (occasionally)
Williams Arena/Old Mariucci Arena  (1950–1993)
Mariucci Arena (1993–present)

Program records

Career
Most goals in a career: John Mayasich, 144 (1951–55)
Most assists in a career: Larry Olimb, 159 (1988–92)
Most points in a career: John Mayasich, 298 (1951–55)
Most penalty minutes in a career: Matt DeMarchi, 473 (1999–2003)
Most points in a career, defenseman: Todd Richards, 158 (1985–89)
Most wins in a career, Kellen Briggs, 84 (2003–07)
Most shutouts in a career, Kellen Briggs, 13 (2003–07); Adam Wilcox, 13 (2012–15)

Season

Players
Most goals in a season: Tim Harrer, 53 (1979–80)
Most assists in a season: Aaron Broten, 59 (1980–81)
Most points in a season: Aaron Broten, 106 (1980–81)
Most penalty minutes in a season: Pat Micheletti, 154 (1984–85)
Most points in a season, defenseman: Mike Crowley, 63 (1995–96)
Most points in a season, rookie: Aaron Broten, 72 (1979–80)
Most shutouts in a season: Kent Patterson, 7 (2011–12)
Most power play goals in a season (since 1975): Tim Harrer, 27 (1979–80)

Team (since 1950)
Most wins in a season: 35 (1985–86)
Most WCHA wins in a season: 28 (1987–88)
Most overtime games in a season: 16 (2007–08)
Longest overall unbeaten streak: 22 (10/13/2006–1/12/2007)

Game

Player
Most goals in a game: John Mayasich, 6 (vs Winnipeg, 12/10/1954)
Most assists in a game: 11 players, 5 (last time: Gino Guyer vs Mercyhurst, 3/27/2003)
Most points in a game: John Mayasich, 8 (at Michigan, 1/14/1955)
Most penalty minutes in a game: Mike Crupi, 27 (at Michigan, 1/13/1967)

Team
Most goals in a game: 16 (vs Brown, 12/21/1979 & vs Maine, 1/4/1986)
Most goals in a period: 8 (at Michigan, 1/5/1979 & at CC, 3/1/1947)
Most assists in a period: 14 (vs Maine, 1/4/1986)
Most penalty minutes in a game: 109 (at UMD, 3/14/1998)
Most penalty minutes in a period: 81 (at UMD, 3/14/1998)

Golden Gophers in the NHL
As of July 1, 2022.

† Bob Johnson won a Stanley Cup as the head coach for the Pittsburgh Penguins.

WHA
Several players also were members of WHA teams.

Source:

References

Notes

Citations

External links

 

 
Ice hockey teams in Minnesota
Big Ten Conference ice hockey